A sport fishing boat, or sport fisher, is a type of power boat designed for recreational fishing by anglers (with rods and lines). Typically, these fishing boats are designed with a cockpit at the stern, fitted with a chair fixed to the deck to which a rod can be secured. Alternately, other rods can be used by hand or mounted. These boats usually have long, high foredeck leading back to a rear-set cabin, which has a flybridge set above. Sport-fishers are used for angling on open water, often while travelling at speed.

References

Motorboats